Kim Jeong-gwan (born 1 March 1970) is a South Korean fencer. He competed in the individual and team épée events at the 1992 Summer Olympics.

References

External links
 

1970 births
Living people
Olympic fencers of South Korea
Fencers at the 1992 Summer Olympics
South Korean male épée fencers
Korea National Sport University alumni
Asian Games medalists in fencing
Fencers at the 2002 Asian Games
Asian Games bronze medalists for South Korea
Medalists at the 2002 Asian Games